SKA-Neftyanik is a professional bandy club from Khabarovsk, Russia, established in 1947. It plays in the Russian Bandy Super League, the top division of Russian bandy. The club colours are yellow, red and black.

History
The team was founded in 1947 and was known under the abbreviations ODO (Okruzhnoy Dom Ofitserov), SKVO (Sportivnyi Klub Voennogo Okruga) and eventually SKA (Sportivnyi Klub Armii). In 1999, after Neftyanik had qualified for the highest division, the two clubs merged to become SKA-Neftyanik. SKA played in the elite division of Soviet bandy ever since 1954. 

Since the 2013-14 season the team plays at the indoor arena, Arena Yerofey. In the 2016-17 season the club became Russian champion for the first time. The club colours are red, yellow and black.

Honours

Domestic
 Russian Champions:
 Winners (4): 2016–17, 2017–18, 2018–19, 2019–20
 Runners-up (5): 1963–64, 1969–70, 1981–82, 1985–86, 1988–89

Cup
 Russian Cup:
 Winners (6): 1988, 2002, 2004, 2014, 2016, 2017
 Runners-up (3): 1954, 2003, 2015

 Russian Bandy Super Cup:
 Winners (1): 2015

International
 Champions Cup:
 Runners-up (1): 2005

SKA-Neftyanik-2
SKA-Neftyanik's second team SKA-Neftyanik-2 plays in the Russian Bandy Supreme League, the second tier of Russian bandy.

References

External links
 Official website

 
Bandy clubs in Russia
Sport in Khabarovsk
Bandy clubs established in 1947
1947 establishments in Russia